The Sick, Dumb & Happy is the second and final studio album by Dutch band The Charm The Fury. It was released on March 17, 2017 through Nuclear Blast. It is the first album to feature rhythm guitarist Martijn Slegtenhorst.

Track listing

Personnel

The Charm The Fury
Caroline Westendorp – vocals
Mathijs Tieken – drums
Rolf Perdok – guitars
Lucas Arnoldussen – bass
Martijn Slegtenhorst – guitars

Production
Mathijs Tieken – production, engineering, mixing on "Corner Office Maniacs"
Daniel Gibson – additional production
Robert Westerholt – additional production
Stefan Helleblad – guitar engineering, drum engineering
Josh Wilbur – mixing
Stefan Glaumann – mixing on "Silent War"
Ted Jensen – mastering
Brian "Big Bass" Gardner – mastering on "Corner Office Maniacs" and "Silent War"
Robert Sammelin – illustrations, design

Charts

References

2017 albums
The Charm The Fury albums
Nuclear Blast albums